Pławowice  is a hamlet lying within the Voivodeship of Małopolska and the County of Proszowice. The river Szreniawa runs alongside Pławowice and its municipal capital of Nowe Brzesko is found 5 km away in the direction of Kraków. At present its population stands at 270 persons. While relatively small and numbering few houses the hamlet boasts a 19th-century palace. The Palace of Pławowice or ‘Pałac Pławowice’ dates back to 1805 and contains within its boundaries a 15ha landscaped park and lake complex as well as its own chapel where mass is held to this day.

History 
The hamlet was first referred to as "Pławowicze" according to the earliest documentation found in the 13th century. As one of the few settlements in the scarcely populated Nowe Brzesko region it was naturally the feudal estate of noble families. By the 16th century it was transferred to the Lanckoroński family after which it changed hands again to the Guteterów family. It is recorded in chronicles of the time that Marcin Wadowita (also known as Wadovius or Campius) a Polish priest, theologian and professor drew from his Pławowice estate in 1641 3000 zlotys to present as a bursary towards the Jagiellonian University of which he was Chancellor, until his death in that same year. He lies buried in the Church of St Florian in Kraków. 

The Pławowice estate continued to change patronage when it came into the ownership of the immensely rich Szembek family. It was in fact Helena Szembekowa who in 1740 brought the estate, through marriage to Stefan Benedykt Morstin, into the hands of the Morstin family, a family originating from Germany who had immigrated to Poland in previous years. Gradually and after numerous name changes from Monderstern, Morstyn, Morsztyn and finally Morstin did the family become fully polonised and settle down in their new homeland. When the Morstins first received the estate in dowry its nucleus was a wooden manor house or dwór. Successive generations of Morstins took great interest in the estate despite their inclination towards the arts and humanities. The neoclassical palace found there today was initiated by Ignacy Morstin who commissioned Jakub Kubicki to undertake the building project. It was built to have two floors as well as a deep cellar on a rectangular plan. The western and eastern fronts of the palace feature eight Doric colonnades with straight entablatures overlooking both entrances and topped with triangular pediments. The whole palace is covered with a four pitched roof with tall chimneys. The ground floor windows are conspicuously small and square compared with the tall and rectangular windows on the first floor. The reason for this was that while the ground floor housed the servants and working rooms the first floor catered for social functions.

Between the late 19th century early 20th century additional extensions were planned to enlarge the palace. While the southern side of the palace was built upon a similar extension for the northern side was abandoned owing to the financial burdens caused by the First World War.

There were two notable people with connections to the Palace of Pławowice: Ludwik Hieronim Morstin and Marian Bronisław Tomaszewski.

Notes 
On 26 and 27 May 2007 the Malopolski Cultural Institute was granted permission by Captain Tomaszewski to include the palace and its grounds in its IX Malopolskie Cultural Heritage program :pl:Małopolskie Dni Dziedzictwa Kulturowego. In the course of those two days the palace had over 8 thousand visitors.

References

External links
 http://www.sikorskimuseum.co.uk
 http://www.kurier.iap.pl
 https://web.archive.org/web/20070712181045/http://www.mik.krakow.pl/english/en-index.html

Villages in Proszowice County
Palaces in Poland